Ptychophallus is a genus of crabs in the family Pseudothelphusidae.

Species
Ptychophallus barbillaensis Rodríguez & Hedström, 2000
Ptychophallus coastaricensis Villalobos, 1974
Ptychophallus cocleensis Pretzmann, 1965
Ptychophallus colombianus (Rathbun, 1893)
Ptychophallus exilipes (Rathbun, 1898)
Ptychophallus goldmanni Pretzmann, 1965
Ptychophallus kuna Campos & Lemaitre, 1999
Ptychophallus lavallensis Pretzmann, 1978
Ptychophallus micracanthus Rodríguez, 1994
Ptychophallus montanus (Rathbun, 1898)
Ptychophallus osaensis Rodríguez, 2001
Ptychophallus paraxantusi (Bott, 1968)
Ptychophallus tristani (Rathbun, 1896)
Ptychophallus tumimanus (Rathbun, 1898)
Ptychophallus uncinatus Campos & Lemaitre, 1999
Ptychophallus xantusi (Rathbun, 1893)

References

Pseudothelphusidae